In Awe may refer to:
 "In Awe", an album by Midnite
 "In Awe", song by the Heritage Singers
 "In Awe", single by Sied van Riel with Waakop Reijers 2012
 "In Awe", song from Where I Belong (Revive album)
 "In Awe", song by Dan Macaulay